Plano Fire-Rescue provides fire protection and emergency medical services to the city of Plano, Texas. The department is responsible for a population of 271,000 residents spread across . It is also the 10 largest department (by number of firefighters) in the state of Texas.

Stations and apparatus

References

Fire
Fire departments in Texas